Lyman Louis Lemnitzer (August 29, 1899 – November 12, 1988) was a United States Army general who served as the fourth chairman of the Joint Chiefs of Staff from 1960 to 1962. He then served as the Supreme Allied Commander Europe of NATO from 1963 to 1969.

Early life and education

Lemnitzer was born on August 29, 1899, in Honesdale, Pennsylvania. He graduated from Honesdale High School in 1917.

He then entered the United States Military Academy at West Point, from which he graduated in 1920 with a commission as a second lieutenant in the United States Army Coast Artillery Corps.

Early career
Lemnitzer graduated from the Coast Artillery School in 1921, and then served at Fort Adams in Rhode Island and in the Philippines. He was an instructor at West Point from 1926 to 1930.

Lemnitzer served again in the Philippines from 1934 to 1935, and graduated from the United States Army Command and General Staff College in 1936. He was an instructor at the Coast Artillery School, and graduated from the United States Army War College in 1940.

At the start of World War II Lemnitzer served with the 70th Coast Artillery Regiment and then the 38th Coast Artillery Brigade. In May 1941, Lemnitzer, then a colonel, was assigned to the War Plans Division of the Army staff, and then to the staff of the Army Ground Forces.

World War II

Lemnitzer was promoted to brigadier general in June 1942 and commanded the 34th Coast Artillery Brigade. He was subsequently assigned to General Dwight D. Eisenhower's staff, where he helped plan the invasions of North Africa and Sicily and was promoted to major general in November 1944. Lemnitzer was one of the senior officers sent to negotiate the Italian fascist surrender during the secret Operation Sunrise and the German surrender in 1945.

Post-World War II
Following the end of World War II, Lemnitzer was assigned to the Strategic Survey Committee of the Joint Chiefs of Staff and was later named deputy commandant of the National War College.

Korean War
In 1950, at the age of 51, Lemnitzer took parachute training and was placed in command of the 11th Airborne Division. He was assigned to Korea in command of the 7th Infantry Division in November 1951 and was promoted to lieutenant general in August 1952.

Post-Korean War

Lemnitzer was promoted to the rank of general and named commander of US Army forces in the Far East and of the Eighth Army in March 1955. He was named Vice Chief of Staff of the United States Army in June 1957, Chief of Staff of the United States Army in July 1959, and appointed as Chairman of the Joint Chiefs of Staff in September 1960. (Lemnitzer was allowed to remain on active duty despite having reached the mandatory retirement age of 60.)  As chairman, Lemnitzer was involved in the Bay of Pigs crisis and the early years of United States involvement in the Vietnam War. He was also required to testify before the United States Senate Foreign Affairs Committee about his knowledge of the activities of Major General Edwin Walker, who had been dismissed from the Army over alleged attempts to promote his political beliefs in the military.

As the Chairman of the Joint Chiefs of Staff at the time, Lemnitzer approved the plans known as Operation Northwoods in 1962, a proposed plan to discredit the Castro regime and create support for military action against Cuba by staging false flag acts of terrorism and developing "a Communist Cuban terror campaign in the Miami area, in other Florida cities and even in Washington". Lemnitzer presented the plans to Secretary of Defense Robert McNamara on March 13, 1962. It is unclear how McNamara reacted, but three days later President John F. Kennedy told the general that there was no chance that the US would take military action against Cuba. Within a few months, after the refusal to endorse Operation Northwoods, Lemnitzer was denied another term as JCS chairman.

In November 1962, Lemnitzer was appointed as commander of U.S. European Command, and as Supreme Allied Commander Europe of the North Atlantic Treaty Organization (NATO). His time in command saw the Cyprus crisis of 1963–1964 and the withdrawal of NATO forces from France in 1966. Known somewhat for his eccentric personality, instead of carrying in place a regulation M1911 semi-automatic pistol which was commonly used by general officers, General Lemnitzer preferred to carry a long-barrelled M-16 Rifle as his personal firearm. As of 2021, Lemnitzer is the only Chairman of the Joint Chiefs Staff to hold another U.S. military command after his term as chairman ended, rather than retiring.

Later life and death

Lemnitzer retired from the military in July 1969.  His 14-year tenure as a four star general on active duty is the second longest at that rank in the history of the U.S. Army, after General William T. Sherman who held that rank from 1869 to 1884.  He was the only person in history to serve as Army Chief of Staff, Chairman of the Joint Chiefs of Staff and as Supreme Allied Commander for NATO.

General Lemnitzer is one of only four officers in the history of the United States Army to have actively served as a general during three major wars (World War II, Korea and Vietnam).  The others were Winfield Scott (War of 1812, Mexican War, Civil War), Douglas MacArthur (World War I, World War II and Korea) and Lewis Hershey (World War II, Korea, Vietnam).

In 1975, President Gerald Ford appointed Lemnitzer to the Commission on CIA Activities within the United States, also known as the Rockefeller Commission, to investigate whether the CIA had committed acts that violated US laws, and allegations that E. Howard Hunt and Frank Sturgis (of Watergate fame) were involved in the assassination of John F. Kennedy.

Lemnitzer died at Walter Reed Army Medical Center on November 12, 1988, and is buried in Arlington National Cemetery. His wife, Katherine Tryon Lemnitzer (1901–1994), is buried with him.

Awards and decorations
Lemnitzer was awarded numerous military awards and decorations including but not limited to:

Foreign decorations

Lemnitzer was a Freemason.

Dates of rank

References

External links

 Finding aid for Lyman L. Lemnitzer Oral History, Dwight D. Eisenhower Presidential Library
 Official US Joint Chiefs of Staff Biography
Generals of World War II

|-

|-

|-

1899 births
1988 deaths
United States Military Academy faculty
United States Army personnel of the Korean War
Burials at Arlington National Cemetery
Chairmen of the Joint Chiefs of Staff
United States Army Chiefs of Staff
United States Military Academy alumni
NATO Supreme Allied Commanders
United States Army Vice Chiefs of Staff
United States Distinguished Marksman
Recipients of the Distinguished Service Medal (US Army)
Recipients of the Silver Star
Recipients of the Legion of Merit
Presidential Medal of Freedom recipients
Recipients of the Croix de Guerre (France)
Grand Croix of the Légion d'honneur
Honorary Companions of the Order of the Bath
Honorary Commanders of the Order of the British Empire
Knights Grand Cross of the Order of Merit of the Italian Republic
Grand Officers of the Military Order of Savoy
Recipients of the Badge of Honour of the Bundeswehr
Grand Cordons of the Order of the Rising Sun
Recipients of the Order of Military Merit (Brazil)
Recipients of the Order of Military Merit (Korea)
Recipients of the Cross of Merit with Swords (Poland)
Recipients of the Military Order of Italy
Knights Grand Cross of the Order of Orange-Nassau
Order of National Security Merit members
Chief Commanders of the Philippine Legion of Honor
American people of German descent
People from Honesdale, Pennsylvania
Recipients of the Navy Distinguished Service Medal
Recipients of the Air Force Distinguished Service Medal
United States Army generals of World War II
United States Army generals
United States Army Command and General Staff College alumni
United States Army War College alumni
United States Army Coast Artillery Corps personnel
Military personnel from Pennsylvania